Hyperbaniana is a monotypic moth genus of the family Erebidae. Its only species, Hyperbaniana costinotata, is found in Sulawesi. Both the genus and species were first described by George Hampson in 1926.

References

Calpinae
Monotypic moth genera